The Pratt & Whitney R-1535 Twin Wasp Junior was an engine used in American aircraft in the 1930s. The engine was introduced in 1932 as a 14-cylinder version of the 9-cylinder R-985. It was a two-row, air-cooled radial design.

Variants
 R-1535-11 - 
 R-1535-13 - , 
 R-1535-44 - 
 R-1535-72 - 
 R-1535-94 - 
 R-1535-96 - 
 R-1535-98 - 
 R-1535-SB4-G -

Applications
Bellanca 28-70
Boeing XF6B
Breguet 695
Bristol Bolingbroke
Canadian Car and Foundry FDB-1
Consolidated XB2Y
Curtiss SBC-3 Helldiver
Douglas O-46
Fokker G.I (G.I The Wasp)
Fokker D.XXI (Finnish licence-built series 4 and 5)
Great Lakes BG
Grumman F2F
Grumman F3F-1
Grumman XJF-1 Duck (prototype only)
Grumman XSBF
Grumman XSF-2
Hughes H-1 Racer
Miles Master
Northrop A-17
Northrop BT
Northrop XFT-2
Vought SBU Corsair
Vought SB2U Vindicator
Vought V-141
Vought XF3U
Vought XO4U-2

Engines on display
 There is a R-1535-96 on display at the New England Air Museum, Bradley International Airport, Windsor Locks, CT.
 There is an R-1535 on display at the San Diego Air and Space Museum.

Specifications (R-1535-SB4-G)

See also

References

Notes

Bibliography
Gunston, Bill. World Encyclopedia of Aero Engines: From the Pioneers to the Present Day. 5th edition, Stroud, UK: Sutton, 2006.
White, Graham. Allied Aircraft Piston Engines of World War II: History and Development of Frontline Aircraft Piston Engines Produced by Great Britain and the United States During World War II. Warrendale, Pennsylvania: SAE International, 1995.

External links

 Pratt & Whitney - R1535 page
 Shanaberger.com - R-1535

1930s aircraft piston engines
Aircraft air-cooled radial piston engines
R-1535